Somnophilia (from Latin somnus "sleep" and Greek φιλία, -philia "friendship") is a paraphilia in which an individual becomes sexually aroused by someone who is unconscious. The Dictionary of Psychology categorized somnophilia within the classification of predatory paraphilias.

Origin
The term somnophilia was coined by John Money in 1986. He characterized the condition as a type of sexual fetishism, described as a type of syndrome: "of the marauding-predatory type in which erotic arousal and facilitation or attainment of orgasm are responsive to and dependent on intruding upon" someone who is unable to respond. He wrote that often the condition then subsequently involves the individual waking the unresponsive sexual partner after the act has been committed.

According to Money, somnophilia may progress to necrophilia, the desire to have sexual relations with a dead body. He characterized it as a form of "stealth and stealing paraphilias" including kleptophilia. Money wrote that somnophilia has a high degree of correlation with acts of incest throughout history. Abuse may follow from the condition including use of force or abduction. Typically, the individual upon whom the sex act is committed by the somnophiliac is a stranger not previously known intimately to the individual. The somnophiliac may create an unconscious state in the victim by drugging them, or may engage in sex with someone who is inebriated or asleep. The perpetrator becomes attracted to the idea of a sexual participant who is unable to resist their advances.

Diagnostic and Statistical Manual of Mental Disorders classified the term in 2000 under DSM-IV TR code 302.9 and in the International Statistical Classification of Diseases and Related Health Problems under ICD-10 code F65.9. The Dictionary of Psychology categorized somnophilia within the classification of predatory paraphilias.

Treatment
Physicians have attempted to treat somnophilia with forms of psychotherapy, as well as with medications used for pedophilia. However, James Cantor, psychologist and editor-in-chief of Sexual Abuse: A Journal of Research and Treatment stated: "There are occasional claims for treatment, but no one has presented meaningful, compelling evidence that someone with a paraphilia can be turned into someone without a paraphilia. As far as we can tell, it’s like sexual orientation." Somnophilia rises to the level of diagnosis when it causes "significant impairment", specifically, when the individual performing the sex act does so with a partner who does not give their consent.

In popular culture
Somnophilia has presented itself as a recurring phenomenon in popular culture, including in the French film influenced by Alfred Hitchcock movies, Who Killed Bambi?. The plot of the horror film involves a surgeon who drugs his female patients in order to rape them. The assailant resorts to murder after one of the women wakes up from her unconscious state as he begins to remove her clothing. The title character attempts to warn the board of directors at the hospital of the murderer's activity.

See also

Notes

References

External links

"Doze Were the Days – A brief look at somnophilia" at Psychology Today

Paraphilias
Sexual fetishism